Ethopabate is a coccidiostat used in poultry.

References

Antiparasitic agents
4-Aminobenzoate esters
Salicylate esters
Acetanilides
Salicylyl ethers